Ankylosauria is a group of herbivorous dinosaurs of the order Ornithischia. It includes the great majority of dinosaurs with armor in the form of bony osteoderms, similar to turtles. Ankylosaurs were bulky quadrupeds, with short, powerful limbs. They are known to have first  appeared in the Middle Jurassic, and persisted until the end of the Cretaceous Period. The two main families of Ankylosaurs, Nodosauridae and Ankylosauridae are primarily known from the Northern Hemisphere, but the more basal Parankylosauria are known from southern Gondwana during the Cretaceous.

Ankylosauria was first named by Henry Fairfield Osborn in 1923. In the Linnaean classification system, the group is usually considered either a suborder or an infraorder. It is contained within the group Thyreophora, which also includes the stegosaurs, armored dinosaurs known for their combination of plates and spikes.

Etymology 
The name of this group of dinosaurs is associated with a number of anatomical features in which small and large bony shields fused together, completely covering their back and sides. On the skull these shields fused with the underlying bones, and the dorsal ribs fit snugly to the vertebrae. The Latin name Ankylosauria is derived from the Greek ἀγκύλος [ankylos] — "curved", "bent" with the anatomical meaning "hard" or "fused" and σαῦρος [sauros] — "lizard".

In the 1908 description of the genus Ankylosaurus, Barnum Brown described the family Ankylosauridae as a group of representatives with a "rigid spine", but noted the wide, curved shape of the ribs, suggesting a "strongly curved" back (an error based on the alleged similarity to stegosaurs and glyptodonts, as ankylosaurs have flat backs). Therefore,  "rigid lizard" and "curved lizard" could be additional meanings applied to the name of ankylosaurs.

Classification
Ankylosauria and Stegosauria together form the two major subgroups of Thyreophora, a group of armoured dinosaurs distinct from ornithopods and marginocephalians. Historically used for forms lacking large vertical plates, Kenneth Carpenter proposed in 1997 the first informal definition of the group, as all ornithischians closer to Ankylosaurus than Stegosaurus. This definition was further refined by Paul Sereno in 2005 to specify Ankylosaurus magniventris and Stegosaurus stenops, the type species of both genera, a definition that was followed by Madzia and colleagues in 2021 when the group name and definition was formalized following the PhyloCode. Phylogenetic and morphological studies have differed on the inclusion of certain early taxa into Ankylosauria, especially the armoured Early Jurassic form Scelidosaurus. As some analyses, like that of Carpenter from 2001 or David B. Norman in 2021 find Scelidosaurus and possibly other early forms like Emausaurus and Scutellosaurus to fall closer to Ankylosaurus than Stegosaurus, Carpenter and later Norman suggested redefining Ankylosauria to limit it to the two subclades Nodosauridae and Ankylosauridae, creating the new clade Ankylosauromorpha for all taxa closer to Ankylosaurus than Stegosaurus. However, as historically even these primitive forms were considered ankylosaurs if they were more derived than Stegosaurus, Madzia and colleagues considered a redefinition of Ankylosauria to be undesirable, instead preferring to abandon Ankylosauromorpha as a same-definition junior synonym of Ankylosauria. The informal clade Euankylosauria, suggested by Norman as an alternative to redefining Ankylosauria, was discussed as potentially being useful in future for the typical group of nodosaurids and ankylosaurids, and was defined in 2021 by Soto-Acuña and colleagues as such as the result of their novel phylogenetic results, which grouped Antarctopelta, Kunbarrasaurus (Minmi sp. of earlier analyses) and their new taxon Stegouros as a unique group of non-euankylosaurian ankylosaurs, which they gave the name Parankylosauria. The result of their phylogenetic analysis is below.

Evolution
The origin of ankylosaurs is poorly understood, and only a few specimens from the Middle Jurassic are known. The ancestry of ankylosaurs has long been sought among stegosaurs, the closest group to ankylosaurs compared to other dinosaurs. Currently, ankylosaurs are a close group of stegosaurs within the Eurypoda clade. They are united by the presence of osteoderms in the skin, the narrow triangular skull of stegosaurs is similar to that of nodosaurids, and some similarity is found in the structure of the palate. Since stegosaurs are known from the Middle Jurassic, ankylosaurs are probably of the same age. They may have split up during the Aalenian period, more than 170 million years ago, but they were definitely in Africa by the Bathonian due to the presence of Spicomellus in Morocco. There are no well-preserved remains of ankylosaurs of that age. An incomplete radius and ulna from the Isle of Skye in Scotland are known, the exact affiliation of which to ankylosaurs or stegosaurs is not established. Most likely, ankylosaurs followed a different evolutionary path than stegosaurs, although it is unknown when and how they split off. In the latter, the osteoderms become raised, and the lateral protection disappears. Ankylosaurs evolved towards the development of osteoderms on the surface of the skull, increased armor and further consolidation of the carapace, which suggests that the ancestor of the carapace consisted of separate non-fused osteoderms.

Paleobiology

Possible neonate-sized ankylosaur fossils have been documented in the scientific literature.

Armor
All ankylosaurians had armor over much of their bodies, mostly scutes and nodules, with large spines in some cases. The scutes, or plates, are rectangular to oval objects organized in transverse (side to side) rows, often with keels on the upper surface. Smaller nodules and plates filled in the open spaces between large plates. In all three groups, the first two rows of plates tend to form a sort of half-ring around the neck; in nodosaurids, this comes from adjacent plates fusing with each other (and there is a third row as well), while ankylosaurids usually have the plates fused to the top of another band of bone. The skull has armor plastered on to it, including a distinctive piece on the outside-rear of the lower jaw.

Diet and feeding
Ankylosaurs were built low to the ground, typically one foot off the ground surface. They had small, triangular teeth that were loosely packed, similar to stegosaurs. The large hyoid bones left in skeletons indicates that they had long, flexible tongues. They also had a large, side secondary palate. This means that they could breathe while chewing, unlike crocodiles. Their expanded gut region suggests the use of fermentation to digest their food, using symbiotic bacteria and gut flora. Their diet likely consisted of ferns, cycads, and angiosperms. Mallon et al. (2013) examined herbivore coexistence on the island continent of Laramidia during the Late Cretaceous. It was concluded that ankylosaurs were generally restricted to feeding on vegetation at, or below, the height of 1 meter.

Vocalization
In February 2023, scientists reported that the possible sounds ankylosaurs may have made were bird-like vocalizations based on a finding of a fossilized larynx from the ankylosaur Pinacosaurus grangeri.

References

 
Bathonian first appearances
Maastrichtian extinctions
Taxa named by Henry Fairfield Osborn
Fossil taxa described in 1923